The Territorial Auxiliary and Volunteer Reserve Associations were formed in 1908 under the provisions of the Territorial and Reserve Forces Act 1907 to provide local support to the Territorial Force in the United Kingdom.

There were originally 104 County Territorial Associations, one for each county.  The Lord Lieutenant of each county was ex-officio president of their Association. In 1922 the title was changed to Territorial and Auxiliary Forces Association when the Auxiliary Air Force was formed.  In 1967 the County Associations were amalgamated into 14 Associations.

Under the Reserve Forces Act 1996 they were renamed Reserve Forces and Cadets Associations in 1999.

References

Military of the United Kingdom